The Portuguese Communist Party (PCP) is a communist, Marxist–Leninist political party in Portugal based upon democratic centralism. The party also considers itself patriotic and internationalist, and it is characterized as being between the left-wing and far-left on the political spectrum.

The party was founded in 1921, establishing contacts with the Comintern in 1922 and becoming its Portuguese section in 1923. The PCP was banned after the 1926 military coup and subsequently played a major role in the opposition against the dictatorial regime of António de Oliveira Salazar. During the nearly five-decade-long dictatorship, the PCP was constantly suppressed by the secret police, which forced the party's members to live in clandestine status under the threat of arrest, torture, and murder. After the Carnation Revolution in 1974, which overthrew the regime, the 36 members of party's Central Committee had, in the aggregate, experienced more than 300 years in jail.

After the end of the dictatorship, the party became a major political force in the new democratic government. One of its goals, according to the party is to maintain its "vanguard role in the service of the class interests of the workers". Currently, the PCP is the fifth largest in the Portuguese Assembly of the Republic, where it holds 6 of the 230 assembly seats.

The party publishes the weekly Avante!, founded in 1931. Its youth organization is the Portuguese Communist Youth, a member of the World Federation of Democratic Youth.

History

Origins 
At the end of World War I, in 1918, Portugal fell into a serious economic crisis, in part due to the Portuguese military intervention in the war. The Portuguese working classes responded to the deterioration in their living standards with a wave of strikes. Supported by an emerging labour movement, the workers achieved some of their objectives, such as an eight-hour working day.

In September 1919, the working-class movement founded the first Portuguese Labour Union Confederation, the General Confederation of Labour; however, the feeling of political powerlessness, due to the lack of a coherent political strategy among the Portuguese working class, plus the growing popularity of the Bolshevik revolution in Russia in 1917, led to the foundation of the Portuguese Maximalist Federation (FMP) in 1919. The goal of FMP was to promote socialist and revolutionary ideas and to organize and develop the worker movement.

After some time, members of the FMP began to feel the need for a "revolutionary vanguard" among Portuguese workers. After several meetings at various trade union offices, and with the aid of the Comintern, this desire culminated in the foundation of the Portuguese Communist Party as the Portuguese Section of the Comintern on 6 March 1921.

Unlike virtually all other European communist parties, the PCP was not formed after a split of a social democratic or socialist party, but from the ranks of anarcho-syndicalist and revolutionary syndicalist groups, the most active factions in the Portuguese labor movement. The party opened its first headquarters in the Arco do Marquês do Alegrete Street in Lisbon. Seven months after its creation, the first issue of O Comunista (The Communist), the first newspaper of the party, was published.

The first congress of the party took place in Lisbon in November 1923, with Carlos Rates as the leader. The congress was attended by about a hundred members of the party and asserted its solidarity with socialism in the Soviet Union and the need for a strong struggle for similar policies in Portugal; it also stated that a fascist coup in Portugal was a serious threat to the party and to the country.

Outlawed 
After the military coup of 28 May 1926, the party was outlawed and had to operate in secrecy. By coincidence, the coup was carried out on the eve of the second congress, forcing the suspension of party business. In 1927, the party's main office was closed. The party was first re-organized in 1929 under Bento Gonçalves. Adapting its new illegal status, the party re-organized as a network of clandestine cells.

Meanwhile, in 1938, the PCP had been expelled from the Comintern. The reason for the expulsion was a sense of distrust in the Comintern caused by a sudden breakdown in the party's activity after a period of strong communist tumult in the country, accusations of alleged embezzlement of money carried out by some important members of the party and, mainly, the weak internal structure of the party, dominated by internal wars. The action against the PCP, signed by Georgi Dimitrov, was in part taken due to some persecution against Comintern member parties or persons (like the Communist Party of Poland or Béla Kun) led by Joseph Stalin. These series of events would, in part, lead to the end of the Comintern in 1943. The PCP would only re-establish its relations with the communist movement and the Soviet Union in 1947, after sporadic contacts made through the communist parties of Spain and France and later through Mikhail Suslov.

After the 1933 rise of Salazar's dictatorial Estado Novo regime, suppression of the party grew. Many members were arrested, tortured, and executed. Many were sent to the Tarrafal concentration camp in the Cape Verde Islands. This included Bento Gonçalves, who would die there. The vast wave of arrests led to a major re-organization in 1940 and 1941, named the "Reorganization of '40". The first congress held after these changes was held in 1943, and stated that the party should unite with all those who also wanted an end to the dictatorship. Another important conclusion was the need to increase the party's influence inside the Portuguese army. The party was able, for the first time, to assure a strong clandestine organization, with a network of clandestine cadres, which would significantly aid the resistance against Salazar's regime.

In 1945, with the defeat of the major fascist regimes in World War II, Salazar was forced to fake some democratic changes to keep up a good image in the eyes of the West, so in October of that year, the democratic resistance was authorized to form a platform, which was named Movement of Democratic Unity (Portuguese: Movimento de Unidade Democrática, or MUD). Initially, the MUD was controlled by the moderate opposition, but it soon became strongly influenced by the PCP, which controlled its youth wing. In the leadership of the youth wing were several communists, among them Octávio Pato, Salgado Zenha, Mário Soares, Júlio Pomar, and Mário Sacramento. This influence led to the MUD being outlawed by the government in 1948, after several waves of suppression.

The fourth congress, held in July 1946, pointed to massive popular struggle as the only way to overthrow the regime, and stated the policies that would help the party leaders that same popular movement. This, along with the consolidation of the clandestine work, was the main conclusion of the congress. A brief report of the conclusions of this congress were published by the Central Committee of the Communist Party of the Soviet Union. At this time, Álvaro Cunhal travelled to Yugoslavia with the aid of Bento de Jesus Caraça to improve relations with the Socialist Bloc. Later, in 1948, he travelled to the Soviet Union to speak with Mikhail Suslov, after which the bonds between the PCP and the International Communist Movement were re-established. Soon after returning from the Soviet Union, Cunhal was arrested by the PIDE.
The fifth congress, held in September 1957, was the only congress to be held outside Portugal. In Kiev, the Party approved its first program and statutes. For the first time, the party took an official position on colonialism, stating that every people had the right of self-determination, and made clear its support of the liberation movements in the Portuguese colonies, such as MPLA in Angola, FRELIMO in Mozambique, and PAIGC in Guinea-Bissau.

In January 1960, a group of ten PCP members managed to escape from the high-security prison in Peniche. The escape returned to freedom many of the leading figures of the Party, among them, Álvaro Cunhal, who would be elected in the following year the first secretary-general in nineteen years. Among the escapees was also Jaime Serra, who would help to organize a secret commando group, the Armed Revolutionary Action (Portuguese: Acção Revolucionária Armada or ARA). The ARA was the armed branch of the PCP that would be responsible in the 1970s for some military action against the dictatorial regime.

In 1961, the Colonial War in Africa began - first in Angola, and in the next year in Mozambique and Guinea-Bissau. The war lasted thirteen years and devastated Portuguese society, forcing many thousands of Portuguese citizens to leave the country, both to seek a better future in countries like France, Germany, or Switzerland and to escape conscription. The PCP, which had been involved in the formation of the nationalist guerrilla movements, along with the Soviet Union, immediately stated its opposition to the war, and its support for the anti-colonial movements. The war prompted unrest in Portuguese society and helped lead to the decline of the Salazar regime.
In 1962, the Academic Crisis occurred. The Salazar regime, fearing the growing popularity of democratic ideas among students, made several student associations and organizations illegal, including the National Secretariat of Portuguese Students. Most members of this organization were intellectual communist militants who were persecuted and forbidden to continue their university studies. With assistance from the PCP, the students responded with demonstrations that culminated on 24 March with a large student demonstration in Lisbon. The demonstration was brutally suppressed by the police, leading to hundreds of injuries among the protesters. Immediately thereafter, the students began a strike against the regime.

In the sixth congress, in 1965, Álvaro Cunhal, elected secretary-general in 1961, released the report, The Path to Victory—The Tasks of the Party in the National and Democratic Revolution, written while he was in exile in Moscow in collaboration with Margarida Tengarrinha, which became a document of major influence in the democratic movement. Widely distributed among the clandestine members, it contained eight political goals, such as "the end of the monopolies in the economy", "the need for agrarian reform and redistribution of the land", and "the democratization of access to culture and education" — policies that the Party considered essential to make Portugal a fully democratic country. Nine years later, on 25 April 1974, the Carnation Revolution occurred, putting an end to 48 years of resistance and marking the beginning of a new cycle in the party's life.

Carnation Revolution 
Immediately after the revolution, basic democratic rights were re-established in Portugal. On 27 April, political prisoners were freed. On 30 April, Álvaro Cunhal returned to Lisbon, where he was received by thousands of people. May Day was commemorated for the first time in 48 years, and an estimated half million people gathered in the FNAT Stadium (now 1 May Stadium) in Lisbon to hear speeches by Cunhal and the socialist Mário Soares. On 17 May, the party's newspaper, Avante!, produced the first legal issue in its history.

The following months were marked by radical changes in the country, always closely followed and supported by PCP. A stormy process to give independence to the colonies started with the full support of the party and, within a year, Guinea-Bissau, Angola, Mozambique, Cape Verde, and São Tomé and Príncipe became independent countries.

Six months after the Carnation Revolution, on 20 October 1974, the party's seventh congress took place. More than a thousand delegates and hundreds of Portuguese and foreign guests attended. The congress set forth important statements that discussed the ongoing revolution in the country. The 36 members of the elected central committee had in the aggregate experienced more than 300 years in jail. On 26 December 1974, the PCP became the first legally recognized party.

The revolutionary process continued. On 11 March 1975, the left-wing military forces defeated a coup attempt by rightists in the military. This resulted in a turn in the revolutionary process to the political left, with the main sectors of the economy, such as the banks, transportation, steel mills, mines, and communications companies, being nationalized. This was done under the lead of Vasco Gonçalves, a member of the military wing who supported the party and who had become prime minister after the first provisional government resigned. The party then asserted its complete support for these changes and for the Agrarian Reform process that implemented collectivization of the agricultural sector and the land in a region named the "Zone of Intervention of the Agrarian Reform" or "ZIRA", which included the land south of the Tagus River. The PCP took the lead of that process and drove it according to the party's program, organizing thousands of peasants into cooperatives. Combined with the party's strong clandestine organization and support of the peasants' movement during the preceding years in that region, these efforts made the south of Portugal the major stronghold of the PCP. The party gained more than half of the votes in Beja, Évora, and Setúbal in subsequent elections.

One year after the revolution, the first democratic elections took place to elect the parliament that would write a new constitution to replace the constitution of 1933. The party achieved 12.52% of the vote and elected 30 members of parliament. In the end, as the party wanted, the constitution included several references to "socialism" and a "classless society" and was approved with the opposition of only one party, the right-wing Democratic and Social Centre (Portuguese: Centro Democrático Social or CDS).

In 1976, after the approval of the constitution, the second democratic election was carried out and the PCP raised its share of the vote to 14.56% and 40 seats. In the same year, the first Avante! Festival took place, and the eighth congress was held in Lisbon from 11–14 November. The congress mainly stated the need to continue the quest for socialism in Portugal and the need to defend the achievements of the revolution against what the party considered to be a political step backward, led by a coalition of the Socialist Party and the right-wing Centro Democrático Social, who opposed the agrarian reform process.

In 1979, the party held its ninth congress, which analysed the state of post-revolutionary Portugal, right-wing politics, and the party's struggles to nationalize the economy. In December 1979, new elections took place. The party formed the United People Alliance (Portuguese: Aliança Povo Unido or APU) in coalition with the Portuguese Democratic Movement (Portuguese: Movimento Democrático Português or MDP/CDE) and increased its vote to 18.96% and 47 seats. The election was won by a centrist/right-wing coalition led by Francisco Sá Carneiro, which immediately initiated policies that the party considered to be contrary to working-class interests. Despite a setback in a subsequent election in 1980, in which the PCP dropped to 41 seats, the party achieved several victories in local elections, winning the leadership of dozens of municipalities in the FEPU coalition. After the sudden death of Sá Carneiro in an air crash in 1980, the party achieved 44 seats and 18.20% of the vote as part of the APU in the 1983 elections. Also in 1983, the party held its tenth congress, which again criticized what it saw as the dangers of right-wing politics.

In 1986, the surprising rise of Mário Soares, who reached the second round in the presidential election, defeating the party's candidate, Salgado Zenha, made the party call an extra congress. The eleventh congress was called with only two weeks' notice, in order to decide whether or not to support Soares against Freitas do Amaral. Soares was supported, and he won by a slight margin. Had he not been supported by the PCP, he would have probably lost. In 1987, after the resignation of the government, another election took place. The PCP, now in the Unitary Democratic Coalition (Portuguese: Coligação Democrática Unitária or CDU) with the Ecologist Party "The Greens" (Portuguese: Partido Ecologista "Os Verdes" or PEV) and the Democratic Intervention (Portuguese: Intervenção Democrática or ID), saw an electoral decline to 12.18% and 31 seats.

Fall of the Socialist Bloc 

In 1988, the PCP held another congress, the twelfth, in which more than 2000 delegates participated and which put forth a new program entitled Portugal, an Advanced Democracy for the 21st Century.

At the end of the 1980s, the Socialist Bloc of Eastern Europe started to disintegrate, and the party faced one of the biggest crises in its history. With many members leaving, the party called a thirteenth congress for May 1990, in which a huge ideological battle occurred. The majority of the more than 2000 delegates decided to continue the party's "revolutionary way to Socialism" — i. e., to retain its Leninist ideology. By so doing, it clashed with what many other communist parties around the world were doing. The congress asserted that socialism in the Soviet Union had failed, but a unique historical experience, several social changes, and several achievements by the labour movement had been influenced by the Socialist Bloc. Álvaro Cunhal was re-elected secretary-general, but Carlos Carvalhas was elected assistant secretary-general.

In the legislative election of 1991, the party won 8.84% of the national vote and 17 seats, continuing its electoral decline.

The fourteenth congress took place in 1992, and Carlos Carvalhas was elected the new secretary-general, replacing Álvaro Cunhal. The congress analysed the new international situation created by the disappearance of the Soviet Union and the defeat of socialism in Eastern Europe. The party also traced the guidelines intended to put Cavaco Silva and the right-wing government on its way out, a fact that would happen shortly after. In 1995, the right-wing Social Democratic Party was replaced in the government by the Socialist Party after the October legislative election, in which the PCP received 8.61% of the votes.

In December 1996, the fifteenth congress was held, this time in Porto, with more than 1600 delegates participating. The congress criticized the right-wing policies of the socialist government of António Guterres, and debated the future of the PCP following the debacle of the Socialist Bloc. In the subsequent local elections, the party continued to decline, but in the legislative election of 1999, the party increased its voting percentage for the first time in many years. The sixteenth congress was held in December 2000, and Carlos Carvalhas was re-elected secretary-general. In the legislative election of 2002, the PCP achieved its lowest voting result ever, with only 7.0% of the vote.

In November 2004, the seventeenth party congress elected Jerónimo de Sousa, a former metal worker, as the new secretary-general.

In the legislative election of February 2005, the Party increased its share of the vote, and won 12 of the 230 seats in parliament, receiving about 430,000 votes (7.60%).

After the 2005 local election, in which the PCP regained the presidency of 7 municipalities, the party holds the leadership of 32 (of 308) municipalities, most of them in Alentejo and Setúbal, and holds the leadership of hundreds of civil parishes and local assemblies. The local administration by PCP is usually marked by concern about such issues as preventing privatization of the water supply, funding culture and education, providing access to sports, and promoting health, facilitating participatory democracy, and preventing corruption. The presence of the Greens in the coalition also keeps an eye on environmental issues such as recycling and water treatment.

The PCP's work now follows the program of an "Advanced Democracy for the 21st Century". Issues like the decriminalization of abortion, workers' rights, the increasing fees for the health service and education, the erosion of the social safety net, low salaries and pensions, imperialism and war, and solidarity with other countries such as Iraq, Afghanistan, Palestine, Cuba, and the Basque Country are constant concerns in the party's agenda.

The party has three members elected to the European Parliament, after the European election of 2014. They sit in the European United Left–Nordic Green Left group.

Since the 2015 legislative election, the party supports the government headed by António Costa, together with the Left Bloc and the Greens. However, the PCP has been historically critical of the Socialist Party.

In in 2017, the party, alongside the Portuguese Socialist Party, the social-democratic PSD, BE and the ecologist party PEV, voted in favour of abolishing party fundraising limits, thereby opening all portuguese parties to private political donorship, with no obligation to disclose the donations source. The new proposal was reluctantly approved by the Portuguese president Marcelo Rebelo de Sousa. 

After the 2019 European Parliament election in Portugal the party lost one european deputy, it now has two members who sit in the European United Left-Nordic Green Left group in the European Parliament.

Reaction to the 2022 invasion of Ukraine 
Since the beginning of the 2022 Russian invasion of Ukraine, the PCP has come under the spotlight for being the sole political party represented in Parliament to have avoided a clear condemnation of Russia from the start, choosing instead to repeatedly blame the United States and NATO for the war.

On 24 February (the first day of the invasion), the party refused to condemn Russia, upon being explicitly invited to do so by Foreign Affairs Minister Augusto Santos Silva (Socialist Party) in a parliamentary debate. The communists stated that the conflict was "more profound" than "a problem between Russians and Ukrainians", and instead blamed the United States, accusing them of being "the party that is truly interested in having a new war in Europe" and of "promoting" it in order to "turn attentions away from internal problems" and to "ensure a large-scale sale of weapons".

On 1 March, the two communist members of the European Parliament voted against a resolution condemning the invasion. The party explained its decision by accusing the resolution of "fuelling the escalation", of "seeking to impose a unilateral view" and of "justifying the colossal process of increasing military expenditures, the strengthening and expansion of NATO and the militarisation of the EU". The document was approved with more than 600 votes in favour, 13 against and 26 abstentions.

On 8 March, the PCP's leader Jerónimo de Sousa blamed all entities involved in the war (Russia included, although referring to its actions by the Kremlin's language of a "military operation"). He stated the party condemned "the whole process of meddling and of confrontation which took place [in Ukraine], the US-promoted coup d'état in 2014, Russia's recent military intervention and the intensification of the bellicose escalation made by the US, NATO and the EU".

On 20 April, the PCP announced that it would not attend the Parliament's solemn session where President of Ukraine Volodymyr Zelensky would speak, the following day. The party's parliamentary leader Paula Santos rejected condoning "the participation of someone who personifies a xenophobic and bellicose power", calling the session a "stage to contribute for the escalation of war".

On 23 April, questioned by a journalist as to whether he considered that there was an invasion going on, party leader Jerónimo de Sousa replied: "There was a military operation which we have condemned." Following the journalist's insistence on the question, he rejected using the word 'invasion' and instead responded: "At least, from the images we have... from the images we have, there is a conflict, there is a war. That is unavoidable and must be recognised."

Electoral results

Since 1987 
Vote share in the Portuguese elections since 1987

(source: Portuguese Electoral Commission ) 

Note:

 In 2004, after the enlargement of the European Union, the number of MEPs elected by Portugal decreased from the original 25 to 24.
The Local election results report the voting for the Municipal Chambers only and don't include occasional coalitions in some municipalities, e.g. in Lisbon, between 1989 and 2001. Voting for the Municipal Assemblies and Parish Assemblies is usually higher (11.7% and 12.0%, respectively, in 2005).
The number of mandates denotes the number of councillors in Local elections, MPs in Parliamentary elections and MEPs in European Parliament elections.
The CDU is composed of the PCP, the PEV and the ID

Presidential elections 

(source: Portuguese Electoral Commission ) 

Notes:

 In 1980, Carlos Brito withdrew in favour of Ramalho Eanes, won.
 In 1986, the Party's first candidate was Ângelo Veloso, that later withdrew in favour of Salgado Zenha, lost.
 In 1986, in the second round, the Party supported Mário Soares, won.
 In 1996, Jerónimo de Sousa withdrew in favour of Jorge Sampaio, won.

Organization

Principles 
The PCP's statutes define the party as the vanguard of the Portuguese proletariat. That vanguard role results from its class nature and its close liaison with the masses, mobilizing them and winning their support.

The PCP organizes in its ranks industrial and office workers, small and medium farmers, intellectuals and technical workers, small and medium shopkeepers, and industrialists, who fight for democracy and for socialism. The party considers itself the legitimate pursuer of the Portuguese people's best traditions of struggle and of their progressive and revolutionary achievements throughout their history.

The PCP upholds Marxism–Leninism as its theoretical basis, which is a materialist and dialectical conception of the world and a scientific tool of social analysis. These principles guide the party's action and enable it to systematically answer new challenges and realities. The party also orients its members and its activity in the spirit of proletarian internationalism, of cooperation between the communist parties and revolutionary and progressive forces, and of solidarity with the workers of other countries.

Aside from upholding Marxism–Leninism and maintaining its "proletarian vanguard role", its goals, according to the party are:
to bring about the process of social transformation and the defeat of capitalism through revolutionary means,
to uphold dialectical and historical materialism as an "instrument of analysis and guide for action",
the rupture with right-wing policies,
the realization of a patriotic and left-wing alternative, and
the realization of an "Advanced Democracy" with the values of the April revolution, for a future socialist and communist Portugal.

Secretaries-General 
 José Carlos Rates (1921–1929)
 Bento António Gonçalves (1929–1942)
 period with no secretary-general (1942–1961)
 Álvaro Cunhal (1961–1992)
 Carlos Carvalhas (1992–2004)
 Jerónimo de Sousa (2004–2022)
 Paulo Raimundo (2022–present)

Internal organization 
The main principle that guides the party's internal structure, being a Leninist party, is democratic centralism, which implies that:
all party organs, from top to bottom, are elected and may be dismissed by those who elected them, if needed;
the members who have tasks in any structure of the party are responsible to both lower and upper levels, being obliged to report the activities to both and to give consideration to their opinions and criticisms;
lower-level structures must respect the decisions of the upper structures;
every member is free to give his opinion during the discussion, and the structures must take in account the contribution of every member;
every member must obey the decisions achieved by consensus or by a majority;
every member must work along with his own structure; and
the party does not recognize the existence of organized factions inside it.

The structure and internal organization of the PCP are defined by its statutes. The most recent statutes were approved in the seventeenth congress, held in 2004. The upper organs of the PCP at the national level are the congress, the central committee, and the central commission of control.

The supreme organ of the party is its congress, which is summoned by the outgoing central committee and held every four years. The congress is composed of delegates elected by the respective lower organs proportional to each organ's membership size. The congress approves its theses after a wide discussion period inside the organizations and may also change the party's program and statutes. All the decisions of the congress are made by the delegates voting. With the exception of the voting for the central committee, which a recent Portuguese law requires to be secret, all voting, including the approval of the theses, are conducted by a show of hands. The theses, after approval, guide all the party's political actions and stances until the next congress.

The main organ between the congresses is the central committee, which is elected in the congresses under a proposal of the retiring central committee. This proposal may only be made after a long period of hearing the lower structures in order to include in it the names they propose. The CC may not change the orientation present in the congress' theses. The main task of the central committee is to define the guidelines of the party's political work and decide the immediate tasks of the party, assuring that the lower structures comply with those decisions. The CC elects, from its members, its Political Bureau, its Secretariat, and also the Central Commission of Control. This last must assure the compliance between the Party's activities and the statutes, and control the Party's finances. The CC may, or may not, elect the party's secretary-general from its members.

The intermediate organs of the Party are, by rule, the organs that coordinate an organization of district, municipality, and parish levels, but organizations at a neighbourhood or professional class level also exist. The main organ of an intermediate part of the party's structure is the Assembly. The Assembly works as a small Congress for the organization members. The Assembly elects the regional or municipal committees, which are responsible for applying the theses of the Assembly to the organization's work.

The base level organ of the Party is the cell. The cell is defined as being the link between the party and the working class and the masses. A cell is composed of a minimum of three Party members and exists at a work place or neighborhood level. The cell may elect its own secretariat, which has the responsibility of discussing and putting into practice the Party's guidelines. The cell must ensure the recruitment of new members, promote the reading of Avante! and the other publications, ensure that the members pay their membership fees and keep the upper structures aware of the cell's political work.

Media 

The Portuguese Communist Party publishes the weekly Avante! (Onward!), widely distributed throughout the country, and also the magazine of theoretical discussion O Militante (The Militant), published bi-monthly. The party's press also includes the bulletin Emigração (Emigration), targeted at the large Portuguese diaspora, and the magazine Portugal e a UE (Portugal and the EU), directed by the party's members elected in the European Parliament, which presents information related to the European politics and to the European United Left–Nordic Green Left group. Both Avante! and O Militante are sold in the party's offices to the members. Buying Avante! is considered one of the members' duties. Avante! is also sold among other newspapers in many news stands around the country.

Avante! was illegally printed and distributed from February 1931 until May 1974. Many times, the newspaper distribution suffered breakdowns due to the suppression by the political police of party members who helped to distribute the newspaper, or due to the destruction of the clandestine printing offices. Successfully evading official censorship, Avante! was one of the very few Portuguese newspapers that freely reported on events like World War II, the Colonial War in Africa or massive workers' strikes and waves of student protest against the dictatorship. Avante! continues to be printed after more than three decades of democracy, and has now a full online edition. The Avante! Festival was named after the newspaper.

During the campaign for the Portuguese legislative election of 2005, the party created a radio broadcast on its website and also a digital forum, being the first Portuguese party to use the internet actively in an electoral campaign. After the last Congress, the statutes were changed and the party now considers its website as another official media and it is regularly updated. The campaign radio broadcast evolved into an online radio station named Comunic. It broadcasts thematic interviews with party's members, music and propaganda.

Usually, the party's largest political campaigns and struggles are supported by the distribution of a massive number of leaflets and advertising posters in hot spots like train stations, factories, universities, main streets, and avenues or markets. The free television spots that the Portuguese law grants to the parties, either in the campaign time or out of it, are used by PCP to promote initiatives and political campaigns.

The party also owns a publishing company, Edições Avante! (Avante! Editions), that publishes and sells several books related to the party's history or to Marxism. Classics of Marxism–Leninism, such as The Communist Manifesto, Capital, On the Jewish Question, or What is to be Done?, several books of Portuguese authors on the history of the party and the resistance, official documents like the program or the statutes, books from foreign authors, like Ten Days that Shook the World and several other works are present in the Avante! Edition's catalog.

Youth organization 

The youth organization of PCP is the Portuguese Communist Youth, and was founded on 10 November 1979, after the unification of the Communist Students League and the Young Communist League. The Portuguese Communist Youth is a member of the World Federation of Democratic Youth, a youth non-governmental organization that congregates several left-wing youth organizations from all the continents. The WFDY holds an international event, named World Festival of Youth and Students, in which the Portuguese Communist Youth uses to participate.

The youth wing follows a structure similar to the Party's, also based on the Leninist principle of democratic centralism, and both organizations maintain a cooperative relationship. JCP is, however, an independent organization.

Mainly composed by students and some working-class young people, the Portuguese Communist Youth has, as its main political concerns, such issues as the promotion of a free and public education for all ages, employment, peace, and housing. It also promotes international solidarity brigades for countries like Cuba, Palestine, or Venezuela, alone or with other European Communist youth organizations like KNE or SDAJ. It has its main organizational strength among high-school and university students, with a strong presence among the Students' unions.

Avante! Festival 

Every year, in the first weekend of September, the party holds a festival called the Avante! Festival (Portuguese: Festa do Avante!). After taking place in different locations around Lisbon, like the Lisbon International Fair, Ajuda or Loures, it is now held in Amora, a city near Seixal, on land bought by the Party after a massive fundraising campaign in the early 1990s. The Party considered this campaign to be the only way to avoid the boycott organized by the owners of the previous festival grounds, a boycott that ultimately resulted in the Festival not being held in 1987.

The festival attracts hundreds of thousands of visitors. The events themselves consist of a three-day festival of music, with hundreds of Portuguese and international bands and artists across five different stages, ethnography, gastronomy, debates, a books and music fair, theatre (Avanteatro), cinema (Cineavante) and sporting events. Several foreign communist parties also participate.

Famous artists, Communist and non-Communist, Portuguese and non-Portuguese, have performed at the Festival, including Chico Buarque, Baden Powell, Ivan Lins, Zeca Afonso, Buffy Sainte-Marie, Holly Near, Johnny Clegg, Charlie Haden, Judy Collins, Richie Havens, Tom Paxton, Ska-P, The Soviet Circus Company, the Kuban Cossack Choir, Dexys Midnight Runners, The Band, Hevia, Brigada Victor Jara, Adriano Correia de Oliveira, Carlos Paredes, Jorge Palma, Manoel de Oliveira, Babylon Circus, and many others.

The preparation of the party begins right after the end of the previous festival. Hundreds of the Party's members and friends, mostly young people, volunteer.

See also 

Politics of Portugal
List of political parties in Portugal
Carnation Revolution
Unitary Democratic Coalition
Avante!
Armed Revolutionary Action

Footnotes

Bibliography

Academic sources

Further reading 
 Carlos Cunha, "Nationalist or Internationalist? The Portuguese Communist Party's Autonomy and the Communist International", in Tim Rees and Andrew Thorpe (eds.), International Communism and the Communist International, 1919-1943. Manchester: Manchester University Press, 1998.
 Carlos Cunha, The Portuguese Communist Party's Strategy for Power, 1921-1986. New York: Garland Publishing, 1992.
 J.G.P. Quintela, Para a História do Movimento Comunista em Portugal: 1. A Construção do Partido (Primeiro Periodo 1919-1929). [Towards a History of the Communist Movement in Portugal: 1. Construction of the Party (First Period, 1919-1929).] Oporto: Afrontamento, 1976.

External links 
In Portuguese:
Portuguese Communist Party official web site
Portuguese Communist Youth official web site
Avante Festival! official website
Avante! newspaper online edition
PCP's short biography by the Carnation Revolution archive centre
In English:
Portuguese Communist Party web site
Portuguese Communist Party programme
Portuguese Communist Youth official web site

 
Political parties in Portugal
Far-left political parties
1921 establishments in Portugal
Comintern sections
Communist parties in Portugal
Eurosceptic parties in Portugal
Formerly banned communist parties
Organisations based in Lisbon
Political history of Portugal
Political parties established in 1921
Left-wing parties
International Meeting of Communist and Workers Parties